Ramose and the Tomb Robbers is a 2003 historical novel by British-born Australian author Carole Wilkinson. It is set in ancient Egypt.

Plot summary
The tomb that the tomb workers are working on is flooded and a new team starts work on it. The tomb workers are sent to Tombos.
Ramose, Hapu, Karoya and Karoya's new cat, Mery, head north to Memphis to see Ramose's dying father, the Pharaoh.
On their way north, Hapu and Ramose are taken by the tomb robbers and made to break into tombs and steal the treasure. They accidentally kill one of the tomb robbers and are sealed in the tomb.

Mery leads them to safety, but they are set upon by villagers who call them tomb robbers. They escape across the Nile as Ramose's father and sister (Hatsheput) come down in a barge. Ramose and his companions decide to go back to Thebes and tell Ramose's father about Mutnofret's plan to kill Ramose.

Characters
 Ramose: former prince, now apprentice scribe
 Karoya: Kushite slave, one of Ramose's friends
 Hapu: an apprentice painter, another of Ramose's friends
 Mery: Karoya's cat, formerly the cat of the cook who died in the flood
 Hori: Leader of the tomb robbers
 Seth: one of the tomb robbers, frightened of spirits, who is killed in the tomb
 Infret: strong but stupid tomb robber

2003 novels
2003 children's books
Novels by Carole Wilkinson
Australian historical novels
Australian children's novels
Children's historical novels
Novels set in ancient Egypt